Apistosia phaeoleuca is a moth of the subfamily Arctiinae. It was described by Paul Dognin in 1899. It is found in Ecuador.

References

Moths described in 1899
Lithosiini
Moths of South America